Hrabove is a village in Podilsk Raion, Odesa Oblast, Ukraine, near the border between Ukraine and Moldova. It belongs to Kodyma urban hromada, one of the hromadas of Ukraine. 

Until 18 July 2020, Hrabove belonged to Kodyma Raion. The raion was abolished in July 2020 as part of the administrative reform of Ukraine, which reduced the number of raions of Odesa Oblast to seven. The area of Kodyma Raion was merged into Podilsk Raion.

References

Villages in Podilsk Raion